Weightlifting at the 2015 African Games in Brazzaville was held between September 7–9, 2015 while Powerlifting was held on September 11 and 12, 2015.

It also counted as 2015 African Weightlifting Championships. Only total medals counted for African Games while snatch and clean & jerk medals counted for the African Weightlifting Championships.

The women's -53 kg gold medallist Elizabeth Onuah of Nigeria was stripped of her medals for doping.

Medal table

Medal summary

Men

Women

Powerlifting

Men

Women

References

External links 
 "IWF, results by events: African games".
 "Official website of IPC Powerlifting".

2015 African Games
African Games
Weightlifting competitions in the Republic of the Congo
2015
2015